Cry for the Strangers is a 1982 American made-for-television horror film based on the book of the same name by John Saul. It was directed by Peter Medak and stars Patrick Duffy. It was originally broadcast on CBS on February 11, 1982.

Plot
In 1937, a young boy wakes up un in the middle of the night and sees apparitions of Native Americans dancing on the beach before discovering his grandparents' bodies buried up to their heads in the sand. He later grows up to be Chief Whalen, the chief of police for that town.

In the present, Dr. Brad Russell (a psychiatrist) and his wife Elaine move to a fishing town on the Pacific coast. They learn about a local legend which says that thunderstorms in the area are accompanied by apparitions of Native Americans dancing on the beach. A local fisherman named Riley believes these to be ghosts of the "storm dancers" of a local native tribe who once performed executions on the beach by burying victims up to the necks in the sand and allowing them to drown as the tide came in. He furthermore believes these apparitions to be connected to a series of mysterious deaths occurring in the community. Chief Whalen suspects Riley.

Robby Palmer, a hyperactive child whom Dr. Russell treated years before, is significantly calmer when he is in the town. During a thunderstorm in the night, he is found outside on the beach where his mother Rebecca has fallen into a pit. She is rescued, but Robby cannot remember anything. The next night, Robby feels compelled to sneak out to the beach, and his sister Missy follows him. While searching for them, Dr. Russell and others find the dead body of Riley. They find Chief Whalen covered in fake Native American war paint, attempting to kill Missy. Whalen is shot dead. Dr. Russell theorizes that the storms triggered Whalen's traumatic childhood memories, leading him to re-enact their deaths by killing others. Elaine wonders who killed the Whalens in the first place. Robby is later shown approaching the apparitions on a stormy night.

Cast
 Patrick Duffy as Dr. Brad Russell
 Cindy Pickett as Elaine Russell
 Lawrence Pressman as Glen Palmer
 Brian Keith as Chief Whalen
 Claire Malis as Rebecca Palmer
 Robin Ignico as Missy Palmer
 Shawn Carson as Robby Palmer
 Jeff Corey as Riley
 Taylor Lacher as Connor
 Parley Baer as Doc Phelps
 Anita Dangler as Miriam Shelling
 Martin Kove as Jeff
 J.V. Bradley as Merle
 Josef James as Young Whalen
 Jerry-Mac Johnston as Max Horton

References

External links
 
Cry for the Strangers at Internet Archive

1982 television films
1982 films
1982 horror films
1980s horror thriller films
1980s mystery films
1982 thriller films
1980s English-language films
American horror thriller films
American mystery films
CBS network films
Films based on American novels
Films directed by Peter Medak
Films set in 1937
Films set in 1982
Films shot in Oregon
Films shot in Washington (state)
American thriller television films
American horror television films
1980s American films